Ruth Zakarian (born February 6, 1966) is an American actress and beauty queen who was the winner of the first ever Miss Teen USA 1983 pageant in Lakeland, Florida. She also competed at Miss USA 1984 but unplaced.

Miss Teen USA
An Armenian American, Zakarian was born in Amsterdam, New York and represented the state of New York at the Miss Teen USA pageant. Before then, she was a babysitter for  Jessica Collins, Miss New York Teen USA 1988 and first runner-up to Miss Teen USA 1988.  In her interview during the pageant, Collins called attention to this fact with Zakarian in attendance.

After Miss Teen USA
Zakarian later worked as an actress under the stage name of Devon Pierce. Her most notable role was as "Diane Westin" on the soap opera The Young and the Restless. She also appeared on Santa Barbara as Isabella Castillo.

Zakarian now resides in Massachusetts. She has one daughter, Fiaba Zakarian who studied Psychology and Economics at Loyola Marymount University.

References

External links
 

1967 births
Living people
American soap opera actresses
American television actresses
American people of Armenian descent
Miss Teen USA winners
People from Amsterdam, New York
Actresses from New York (state)
20th-century American actresses
21st-century American women